Fallon is a full-service advertising agency headquartered in Minneapolis, Minnesota, with affiliate offices in London, Detroit, and Tokyo. It is a subsidiary of Publicis.

History
Fallon was founded in 1981 as Fallon McElligott Rice in 1981 by Patrick Fallon, Tom McElligott, Nancy Rice, Fred Senn and Irv Fish. Fallon printed a full-page agency manifesto in the Minneapolis Star and Minneapolis Tribune in 1981, seeking “companies that would rather outsmart the competition than outspend them”—a cold call for national advertising work that ran only in the local papers, and a “provocative message pitching scientific thinking and a condemnation of the prevailing strategies of the industry.”

Fallon McElligott Rice's first national client was an insurance agency, ITT Life.  In 1981, the agency added several more national accounts to its roster, including The Wall Street Journal, US West, and the Episcopal Church. The agency was named Ad Age's Agency of the Year in 1983, 1995, 1997 and, was the Comeback Agency of the Year in 2015.

Notable campaigns

 Rolling Stone - Perception/Reality - increased Rolling Stone's ad pages by 81% in just four years
 Jim Beam - Back to the Basics
 Lee Jeans - Buddy Lee  - increased Rolling Stone's ad pages by 81% in just four years
 McDonald's - Arch Deluxe - one of the largest ad campaign failures ever.
 BMW - BMW Films 
 Cadbury Dairy Milk – Gorilla

Key people 
 Pat Fallon – Co-founder
 Tom McElligott - Co-founder, Creative director
 Mike Buchner – Chairman

References

External links
 Official site
 Website for Pat Fallon and Fred Senn's book, "Juicing the Orange"
 The Work: 25 Years of Fallon, Pat Fallon and Bob Barrie, Easton Studio Press, 2006

Advertising agencies of the United States
Companies based in Minneapolis
Publicis Groupe